The 2018–19 Central Connecticut Blue Devils women's basketball team represented Central Connecticut State University during the 2018–19 NCAA Division I women's basketball season. The Blue Devils were led by twelfth-year head coach Beryl Piper, and played their home games at the William H. Detrick Gymnasium in New Britain, Connecticut as members of the Northeast Conference. They finished the season 7–21 overall, 4–14 in NEC play to finish in ninth place. They failed to qualify for the NEC women's tournament.

Roster

Schedule

|-
!colspan=9 style=| Non-conference regular season

|-
!colspan=9 style=| NEC regular season

See also
 2018–19 Central Connecticut Blue Devils men's basketball team

References

Central Connecticut Blue Devils women's basketball seasons
Central Connecticut Blue Devils
Central Connecticut Blue Devils women's basketball
Central Connecticut Blue Devils women's basketball